Ľudmila Milanová (born 22 March 1967 in Kežmarok) is a Slovak former alpine skier who competed for Czechoslovakia in the 1988 Winter Olympics and 1992 Winter Olympics.

References

External links
 

1967 births
Living people
Slovak female alpine skiers
Olympic alpine skiers of Czechoslovakia
Alpine skiers at the 1988 Winter Olympics
Alpine skiers at the 1992 Winter Olympics
Czechoslovak female alpine skiers
Universiade medalists in alpine skiing
People from Kežmarok
Sportspeople from the Prešov Region
Universiade gold medalists for Czechoslovakia
Competitors at the 1987 Winter Universiade
Competitors at the 1989 Winter Universiade
Competitors at the 1991 Winter Universiade